Essex County is a county located in the Middle Peninsula in the U.S. state of Virginia; the peninsula is bordered by the Rappahannock River on the north and King and Queen County on the south. As of the 2020 census, the population was 10,599. Its county seat is Tappahannock.

History 
Essex County was established in 1692 from the old Rappahannock County, Virginia (not to be confused with the present-day Rappahannock County, Virginia). The county is named for either the shire or county in England, or for the Earl of Essex.

Geography
Its main town, Tappahanock, is focused at the Rappahanock River.

Adjacent counties
 Westmoreland County – north
 Richmond County – northeast
 Middlesex County – southeast
 King and Queen County – south
 Caroline County – west
 King George County – northwest

Major highways

National protected area
 Rappahannock River Valley National Wildlife Refuge (part) Hutchinson unit, Thomas unit

Demographics

2020 census

Note: the US Census treats Hispanic/Latino as an ethnic category. This table excludes Latinos from the racial categories and assigns them to a separate category. Hispanics/Latinos can be of any race.

2000 Census
As of the census of 2000, there were 9,989 people, 3,995 households, and 2,740 families residing in the county.  The population density was 39 people per square mile (15/km2).  There were 4,926 housing units at an average density of 19 per square mile (7/km2).  The racial makeup of the county was 57.96% White, 39.04% Black or African American, 0.55% Native American, 0.81% Asian, 0.03% Pacific Islander, 0.32% from other races, and 1.28% from two or more races.  0.72% of the population were Hispanic or Latino of any race.

There were 3,995 households, out of which 28.00% had children under the age of 18 living with them, 50.70% were married couples living together, 14.00% had a female householder with no husband present, and 31.40% were non-families. 26.10% of all households were made up of individuals, and 11.30% had someone living alone who was 65 years of age or older.  The average household size was 2.46 and the average family size was 2.95.

In the county, the population was spread out, with 22.90% under the age of 18, 7.00% from 18 to 24, 27.00% from 25 to 44, 25.70% from 45 to 64, and 17.30% who were 65 years of age or older.  The median age was 40 years. For every 100 females there were 89.90 males.  For every 100 females age 18 and over, there were 88.20 males.

The median income for a household in the county was $37,395, and the median income for a family was $43,588. Males had a median income of $29,736 versus $22,253 for females. The per capita income for the county was $17,994.  About 7.70% of families and 11.20% of the population were below the poverty line, including 16.80% of those under age 18 and 11.80% of those age 65 or over.

Government

Board of supervisors
 Central District: John Magruder (I)
 Greater Tappahannock District: Robert Akers (I)
 North  District: Sidney N. Johnson (I)
 South District: Ronnie Gill
 At Large: Bud Smith

Constitutional officers
 Clerk of the Circuit Court: Gayle J. Ashworth (I)
 Commissioner of the Revenue: Thomas M. Blackwell (I)
 Commonwealth's Attorney: Vince S. Donoghue (R)
 Sheriff: Walter "Arnie" Holmes (I)
 Treasurer: B. A. "Penny" Davis (I)

Essex is represented by Republican Ryan T. McDougle in the Virginia Senate, Republican M. Keith Hodges in the Virginia House of Delegates, and Republican Robert J. "Rob" Wittman in the  U.S. House of Representatives.

Education
Essex County Public Schools (ECPS) is the public schools system for Essex County, Virginia, United States. The following schools make up the Essex County Public Schools system:

Tappahannock Elementary School (Grades PK - 4th) 
Essex Intermediate School (Grades 5th - 8th) 
Essex High School (Grades 9th - 12th)

Other schools located in Essex County include:

St Margaret's School (Grades 8th - 12th, girls only) 
Tappahannock Junior Academy (Grades K - 10th) 
Aylett Country Day School (Grades PK - 8th)

Communities

Town
 Tappahannock

Unincorporated communities

Notable residents
 David George- African American ex-slave founder of Silver Bluff Baptist Church
 Former NBA  player Xavier McDaniel once lived in this county.
 U.S. Senator Paul S. Trible Jr. was Commonwealth's Attorney of Essex County.
 Robert Mercer Taliaferro Hunter, 1809–1887.  Speaker of the United States House of Representatives and Confederate States Secretary of State.
 Grammy Award-winning R&B singer Chris Brown was born and raised in this county.
 Richard B. Garnett- Confederate States of America general who was killed while leading his brigade during Pickett's Charge.

See also
 National Register of Historic Places listings in Essex County, Virginia

References

External links
 
 Essex County Museum

 
Virginia counties
1692 establishments in the British Empire